Reclinervellus nielseni is one of the spider-ectoparasitoids belonging to the Polysphincta genus-group (Hymenoptera, Ichneumonidae, Pimplinae) and utilizes exclusively Cyclosa spiders (Araneae, Araneidae) as hosts. The species is distributed through Canada region (from Britain to Japan) but is rather sparse. Host spider species is different in accordance with the region, that is Cyclosa conica in Europe whereas Cyclosa argenteoalba in Japan.

Host manipulation 
Reclinervellus nielseni is known to manipulate web-building behavior of the host spider (Cyclosa argenteoalba) to modify an original fragile orb-web into a simple and durable web with conspicuous web decorations. The modified web is derived from a pre-programmed resting web constructed before spiders' molting, verified by the conformity of web shape and the presence of specific web decoration. The web decorations are thought to serve as a web-advertiser toward flying and potential web destroyers (birds and insects). Although the molting web structure usually only the two days the spider takes to molt, the larvae remain within their spider-cocoon for up to ten days before hatching.

References

Pimplinae
Insects described in 1923
Mind-altering parasites